James Weaver Rae Jr.  (October 7, 1917 – January 7, 2013) was an American professional basketball player. He played in the National Basketball League for the Toledo Jim White Chevrolets and averaged 3.3 points per game for his career.

References 

1917 births
2013 deaths
American men's basketball players
United States Navy personnel of World War II
Basketball players from Ohio
Centers (basketball)
Michigan Wolverines men's basketball players
Michigan Wolverines men's track and field athletes
People from Bowling Green, Ohio
Toledo Jim White Chevrolets players